José Francisco Gabriel de Anda (born 5 June 1971) is a Mexican former professional footballer who currently works for ESPN Deportes and ESPN Mexico as an analyst.

Club career
He played for several clubs, including Santos Laguna, Cruz Azul, Pachuca and Correcaminos

International career
He played for the Mexico national football team and was a participant at the 2002 FIFA World Cup.

Personal life
Contrary to popular belief, his given name is "Francisco", and his last names are "Gabriel" and "de Anda". This confusion happens because Gabriel is a common given name.

Gabriel de Anda currently works for ESPN Deportes and ESPN Mexico as an analyst.

His brother, Juan Carlos Gabriel de Anda, is also a sports analyst and has worked for FOX and ESPN.

Career statistics

International goals

|-
| 1. || March 18, 1998 || Estadio Azteca, Mexico City, Mexico ||  || align=center|1–1 || align=center|1–1 || Friendly
|-
| 2. || April 17, 2002 || Giants Stadium, East Rutherford, United States ||  || align=center|1–0 || align=center|1–0 || Friendly
|}

Honours
Santos Laguna
Mexican Primera División: Invierno 1996

Pachuca
Mexican Primera División: Invierno 2001, Apertura 2003
CONCACAF Champions' Cup: 2002

Mexico
CONCACAF Gold Cup: 1998

References

1971 births
Living people
Footballers from Mexico City
Mexican people of Spanish descent
Mexican people of Lebanese descent
Association football defenders
Mexican footballers
Mexico international footballers
CONCACAF Gold Cup-winning players
1997 FIFA Confederations Cup players
1997 Copa América players
1998 CONCACAF Gold Cup players
2002 CONCACAF Gold Cup players
2002 FIFA World Cup players
Correcaminos UAT footballers
Santos Laguna footballers
Cruz Azul footballers
C.F. Pachuca players
Liga MX players
[[Category:Sportspeople of Lebanese descent]]